Bradyrhizobium embrapense is a nitrogen-fixing bacterium from the genus of Bradyrhizobium.

References

Nitrobacteraceae
Bacteria described in 2015